Eupholus is a genus of beetle in the family Curculionidae. The genus includes some of the most colourful of the weevils. The colour may serve as a warning to predators that they are distasteful. Most species feed upon yam leaves, some of which are toxic to other animals. The species occur in New Guinea and adjacent islands. This genus was described by French entomologist Jean-Baptiste Alphonse Dechauffour de Boisduval in 1835.

List of the described species 

 Eupholus albofasciatus Heller, 1910 
 Eupholus alternans Kirsch, 1877 
 Eupholus amaliae Gestro, 1875 
 Eupholus amalulu Porion, 1993 
 Eupholus antonkozlovi Porion & Audibert, 2019 
 Eupholus astrolabensis Heller, 1937 
 Eupholus azureus MacLeay, 1885 
 Eupholus beccari Gestro, 1875 
 Eupholus bennetti Gestro, 1876 
 Eupholus bennigseni Heller, 1908
 Eupholus bhaskarai Grasso, 2020 
 Eupholus bortolussii Grasso, 2019  
 Eupholus brossardi Limoges & Le Tirant, 2010
 Eupholus browni Bates, 1877 
 Eupholus bruyni Gestro, 1885 
 Eupholus casadioi Grasso, 2019 
 Eupholus chaminadei Porion, 2000 
 Eupholus chevrolati Guérin-Meneville, 1830
 Eupholus cinnamomeus Pascoe, 1888 
 Eupholus circulifer Riedel & Porion, 2009
 Eupholus clarki Porion, 1993 
 Eupholus compositus Faust, 1892 
 Eupholus cuvieri Guérin-Meneville, 1830
 Eupholus decempustulatus (Gestro, 1879)
 Eupholus detanii Limoges & Porion, 2004
 Eupholus dhuyi Porion, 1993 
 Eupholus ducopeaui Porion, 2000 
 Eupholus euphrosyne Porion, 1993
 Eupholus faisali Grasso, 2019 
 Eupholus fleurenti Porion, 1993 
 Eupholus geoffroyi Guérin-Meneville, 1830
 Eupholus helleri Porion, 1993 
 Eupholus hephaistos Porion, 1993 
 Eupholus hudsoni Porion, 2000 
 Eupholus humeralis Heller, 1908 
 Eupholus humeridens Heller, 1895 
 Eupholus kotaseaoi Porion, 2000 
 Eupholus kuntzmannorum Limoges & Porion, 2004
 Eupholus labbei Porion, 2000 
 Eupholus lachaumei Porion, 1993 
 Eupholus lacordairei Limoges & Porion, 2004
 Eupholus leblanci Limoges & Porion, 2004
 Eupholus linnei J. Thomson, 1857
 Eupholus loriae Gestro, 1902 
 Eupholus lorrainei Limoges & Le Tirant, 2010
 Eupholus magnificus Kirsch, 1877 
 Eupholus malotrus Porion, 2000 
 Eupholus mamberamonis Heller, 1942 
 Eupholus messageri Porion, 1993 
 Eupholus mimicus Riedel, 2010
 Eupholus nagaii Porion, 1993 
 Eupholus nickerli Heller, 1913 
 Eupholus petitii Guérin-Méneville, 1841
 Eupholus prasinus Heller, 1910 
 Eupholus quadrimaculatus Kirsch, 1877 
 Eupholus quinitaenia Heller, 1915 
 Eupholus rigouti Porion, 1993 
 Eupholus saugrenus Porion, 1993 
 Eupholus schneideri Riedel, 2002
 Eupholus schoenherri Guérin-Meneville, 1830
 Eupholus sedlaceki Riedel, 2010
 Eupholus sofia Porion, 2000 
 Eupholus suhandai Porion, 2000 
 Eupholus sulcicollis Heller, 1915
 Eupholus tupinierii Guérin-Méneville, 1838
 Eupholus vehti Heller, 1914 
 Eupholus vlasimskii Balke & Riedel in Riedel, 2002
 Eupholus waigeuensis Limoges & Porion, 2004

References 

  1. Limoges (R.) & Porion (Th.), 2004 - The Beetles of the World, volume 19, Supplement 2. New Eupholus from New Guinea, Hillside Books, Canterbury 
  2. Porion (Th.), 1993 - The Beetles of the World, volume 19. Eupholus (Curculionidae), Sciences Nat, Venette 
  3. Porion (Th.), 2000 - The Beetles of the World, volume 19, Supplement 1. New Eupholus from New Guinea, Hillside Books, Canterbury 

Entiminae
Curculionidae genera
Taxa named by Jean Baptiste Boisduval